James Strong may refer to:

 James Strong (college president) (1833–1913), American theologian and the first president of Carleton College in Minnesota
 James Strong (director), British television director and writer
 James Strong (theologian) (1822–1894), American Methodist biblical scholar and educator, creator of Strong's Concordance and co-author of McClintock and Strong's Cyclopaedia
 James Strong (U.S. politician) (1783–1847), United States Representative from New York
 James Clark Strong (1826–1915), Union brevet brigadier general in the American Civil War
 James G. Strong (1870–1938), United States Representative from Kansas 
 James Hooker Strong (1814–1882), United States Navy admiral
 Jim Strong (American football coach) (born 1954), former college football coach
 Jim Strong (running back) (born 1946), American football player
 James Strong (Australian businessman) (1944–2013), Australian businessman, CEO of Qantas
 Jimmy Strong (musician) (1906–1977), American jazz reedist

See also
 James Stronge (disambiguation)
 George Strong (footballer) (1916–1989), commonly known as Jimmy Strong